The 2018–19 Georgia Southern Eagles women's basketball team represents Georgia Southern University in the 2018–19 NCAA Division I women's basketball season. The Eagles, led by fourth year head coach Kip Drown, play their home games at Hanner Fieldhouse and were members of the Sun Belt Conference. They finished the season 7–22, 2–16 in Sun Belt play to finish in last place. They failed to qualify for the Sun Belt women's tournament.

On March 10, head coach Kip Drown's contract was not renewed. He finished a four-year record at Georgia Southern of 32–86. On March 27, the school hired Anita Howard from Division II Columbus State University as a head coach.

Roster

Schedule

|-
!colspan=9 style=| Non-conference regular season

|-
!colspan=9 style=| Sun Belt regular season

See also
2018–19 Georgia Southern Eagles men's basketball team

References

External links

Georgia Southern Eagles women's basketball seasons
Georgia Southern